Erba may refer to:

Places
China
Erba, Wuwei County (二坝镇), town in Wuwei County, Anhui
Erba, Harbin (二八镇), town in Hulan District, Harbin

Italy
 Erba, Lombardy, a comune in the Province of Como
 Caslino d'Erba, a comune in the Province of Como, Lombardy
 Lurago d'Erba, a comune in the Province of Como, Lombardy

People
 Erba-Odescalchi, an Italian aristocratic family
 Luciano Erba, an Italian poet